Monsoon is the second and final studio album by American indie rock band Preston School of Industry. It includes guest appearances by Wilco members and Scott McCaughey.

Critical reception

Monsoon received mixed reviews from critics. On Metacritic, the album holds a score of 62/100 based on 21 reviews, indicating "generally favorable reviews."

Track listing
"The Furnace Sun"
"Walk of a Gurl"
"Caught in the Rain"
"Line It Up"
"So Many Ways"
"If the Straits of Magellan Should Ever Run Dry"
"Her Estuary Twang"
"Escalation Breeds Escalation"
"Get Your Crayons Out!"
"Tone It Down"
All music & lyrics by Spiral Stairs.

Personnel
Scott Kannberg - vocals, guitars, harmonica
Matthew Zeek Harris - drums (1-7, 9)
Dan Carr - bass guitar (1-4, 7, 9)
Chris Heinrich - pedal steel guitar (1, 3, 5, 7, 9)
Lara Scudder - drums (1, 3, 4, 6)
Scott McCaughey - mandolin (3, 10)
Jeff Tweedy - skronk guitar (9)
Leroy Bach - tuba keys, ashtrays (9)
Glenn Kotche - percussion (9)
John Stirratt - casiotone (9)
Chrissy K. - backing vocals (1)

References

2004 albums
Preston School of Industry (band) albums
Domino Recording Company albums
Matador Records albums